is a velodrome located in Hakodate, Hokkaido that conducts pari-mutuel Keirin racing - one of Japan's four authorized  where gambling is permitted. Its Keirin identification number for betting purposes is 11# (11 sharp).

Hakodate's oval is 400 meters in circumference. A typical keirin race of 2,025 meters consists of five laps around the course.

Hakodate Velodrome is the only facility on the island of Hokkaido used for Keirin races. Races are held during warm weather months, from April to October.

External links
Hakodate Keirin Home Page (Japanese)
keirin.jp Hakodate Information (Japanese)

Velodromes in Japan
Buildings and structures in Hakodate
Cycle racing in Japan
Sports venues in Hokkaido